The Queen's River is a river in the U.S. state of Rhode Island. There is one dam along the river's length.

Course
The river rises out of Dead Swamp in West Greenwich and flows due south through Exeter and into South Kingstown where it converges with Glen Rock Brook to become the Usquepaug River.

Crossings
Below is a list of all crossings over the Queen River. The list starts at the headwaters and goes downstream.
Exeter
Ten Rod Road (RI 102)
William Reynolds Road
Mail Road
South Kingstown
Dugway Road

Tributaries
In addition to many unnamed tributaries, the following brooks feed the Queen:
Sodom Brook
Locke Brook
Rake Factory Brook

See also
List of rivers in Rhode Island
Usquepaug River

References
Maps from the United States Geological Survey

Rivers of Kent County, Rhode Island
Rivers of Washington County, Rhode Island
West Greenwich, Rhode Island
Exeter, Rhode Island
South Kingstown, Rhode Island
Rivers of Rhode Island
Tributaries of Pawcatuck River
Wild and Scenic Rivers of the United States